Mabia Akhter Simanta (born 7 October 1999) is a Bangladeshi weightlifter. She was born in Madaripur. She won gold  medal in the women's 63 kg weight class at the 2016 South Asian Games at Guwahati. She also won a gold in youth section and two silver medals in senior & juniors section in the Commonwealth Weightlifting Championship in Pune, India in October 2015 in the women's 63 kg category. She lifted a total weight of 176 kg in winning the gold medal.

Early life 
Akhter's father Harunur Rashid was a small grocery owner.

Career
She came into weightlifting by her maternal uncle, Shahadat Kazi in 2010. She won a bronze in the 2012 South Asian Weightlifting Championship, silver in the 2013 Commonwealth Weightlifting Championship in Malaysia.

In 2016, she took part in the Asian Weightlifting Championships for the first time and stood 13th in the women's 63 kg weight class. Mabia stood 6th in the same category during her 18th Asian Games journey.

Besides her sporting career, Mabia serves in Bangladesh Ansar.

Personal life
Mabia Akhter came from a poor family. At one time her study was stopped due to poverty. Now she got admitted to Bangladesh Open University to continue her study.

Awards
 Anannya Top Ten Awards (2015)

See also
 Mahfuza Khatun, Bangladeshi swimmer

References

External links
 Interview in Prothom Alo published on 16 February 2016. 

Living people
Bangladeshi female weightlifters
1999 births
People from Madaripur District
Weightlifters at the 2018 Asian Games
South Asian Games gold medalists for Bangladesh
Asian Games competitors for Bangladesh
South Asian Games medalists in weightlifting
21st-century Bangladeshi women